Okšov Oaks is a protected site within the village of Zlatníky, Trenčín Region, Slovakia. The nature reserve covers an area of 1.53 ha in the Povazsky Inovec mountains. It has a protection level of 4 under the Slovak nature protection system.

Description
The area was protected to preserve stands of oaks growing as solitary trees or in groups. These trees are remarkable because of their age, monumental growth and aesthetic appearance. The site is used for scientific research and educational purposes.

Gallery

References

Protected areas of Slovakia
Geography of Trenčín Region